Rolando Ortiz Velázquez is a Puerto Rican politician and the current mayor of Cayey. Ortiz is affiliated with the Popular Democratic Party (PPD) and has served as mayor since 1997.

He graduated from the Benjamin Harrison High School in Cayey. Obtained a bachelor's degree in Business Administration at the University of Puerto Rico at Cayey.  Graduated from Turabo University, BA in criminology, Magna Cum Laude. Earned a juris doctor from the Interamerican University of Puerto Rico School of Law.

Before being elected mayor, Ortiz served President of the Municipal Legislature of Cayey from 1988 to 1992 and later as member of the House of Representatives of Puerto Rico from 1993 to 1997. He represented District 29.

At the 2012 general election, Ortiz received 73.29% of the votes. This was the largest margin of victory for any mayor in that election, which led a newspaper to label him as one of the "most powerful" mayors in the island.

References

|-

|-

Living people
Interamerican University of Puerto Rico alumni
Mayors of places in Puerto Rico
Popular Democratic Party members of the House of Representatives of Puerto Rico
Popular Democratic Party (Puerto Rico) politicians
People from Cayey, Puerto Rico
Year of birth missing (living people)